Plestiodon multilineatus, the Chihuahuan skink, is a species of lizard which is endemic to Mexico.

References

multilineatus
Reptiles of Mexico
Reptiles described in 1957
Taxa named by Wilmer W. Tanner